Paweł Skowroński is a Polish sprint canoer who has competed since the late 2000s. He won two medals at the ICF Canoe Sprint World Championships with a silver (C-4 500 m: 2006) and a bronze (C-2 200 m: 2010).

References
 
 

Living people
Polish male canoeists
Year of birth missing (living people)
Place of birth missing (living people)
ICF Canoe Sprint World Championships medalists in Canadian